John Antonio Moroso (1874–1957) was an American writer.

Moroso was born into an Italian-American family in Charleston, S.C. He graduated from The Citadel in 1894 where he was poet laureate of his class. He moved to New York City after graduation where he worked as a newspaper and court reporter. During the 1910s he wrote short stories for Collier's Weekly and other major publications.  He also contributed his writings to the "American Boy Adventure Stories," a series of short stories by a variety of authors. While working in New York City he became a friend of the poet, Joyce Kilmer.

In 1923 Moroso wrote a story about life in an east side New York City neighborhood titled The Stumbling Herd, which was made into a silent film in 1926. In 1934 he published Black Chalice and two years later one of his best-known works, Nobody's Buddy. This novel about a boy and his dog originated as a short story called "Buddy and Waffles" published in the August 1915 issue of Ladies' Home Journal.

For a time, Moroso served as president of the corporation that published the Greenville Daily News in Greenville, South Carolina.

References

External links
 

20th-century American novelists
American children's writers
American male novelists
American writers of Italian descent
1874 births
1957 deaths
American male short story writers
20th-century American short story writers
20th-century American male writers